Striker is a soccer video game series first released by Rage Software in 1992.

Later also for the Commodore Amiga, Amiga CD32, Atari ST, PC, Mega Drive/Genesis, and Super NES. It was bundled in one of the Amiga 1200 launch packs. It was one of the first soccer games to feature a 3D viewpoint, after Simulmondo's I Play 3D Soccer.

The Mega Drive and Game Gear versions were branded as Sega Sports Striker. They were published by SEGA and developed by Rage Software in 1994 and released in 1995.

Critical reaction
The game received a mixed reaction from the gaming press, with some condemning and others praising its extreme speed. For example, CU Amiga Magazine awarded the game 94% in its June 1992 issue along with the CU Amiga Screenstar award while German magazine Amiga Joker awards the game 64% in the September 1992 edition.

By 1995, Striker sold 700,000 copies.

Ports/Sequels

Ports

Sequels
A sequel, World Cup Striker (known in North America as Elite Soccer), was released for the Super NES in 1994. It was basically a repackaged version of Striker, but slightly better. It was published in Japan by Coconuts Japan and in Europe by Elite.

A Game Boy game developed by Denton Designs was also released at the same time, in Europe it was released as Soccer, in North America as Elite Soccer (both published by GameTek), and in Japan as World Cup Striker (published by Coconuts Japan and endorsed by Yasutaro Matsuki).

Also, Striker Pro was released in Europe and North America for the CD-i. In 1995, Striker: World Cup Special was released for the 3DO. A version of Striker '95 was in development for the Atari Jaguar but never released. An entry in the Striker franchise was in the works for the Panasonic M2 but it never happened due to the system's cancellation.

A year later Striker '96 (known in Japan as Striker: World Cup Premiere Stage) was released for the PlayStation, Sega Saturn and MS-DOS. Striker '96 is known for being the first soccer game on the original PlayStation.

In 1999 UEFA Striker, known in North America as Striker Pro 2000, was released for the Dreamcast and PlayStation.

A follow up, UEFA 2001, was announced for the Dreamcast in 2000, but was cancelled in October 2000 when Infogrames was re-evaluating their Dreamcast support, and the game was never released on any platform.

References

External links

 Striker (SNES) at GameFAQs

1992 video games
1993 video games
Amiga games
Atari ST games
Cancelled Atari Jaguar games
Cancelled Panasonic M2 games
Amiga CD32 games
DOS games
Association football video games
Sega Genesis games
Coconuts Japan games
Super Nintendo Entertainment System games
Video games scored by Allister Brimble
Video games scored by Mark Cooksey
Video games developed in the United Kingdom
Rage Games games